Ronald Golias (May 4, 1929 — September 27, 2005) was a Brazilian comedian and actor.

Biography
Golias was born in the city of São Carlos, in the state of São Paulo, Brazil, and worked as a tailor assistant and insurance agent, amongst other professions. But, during the 1950s, he impressed Manoel de Nóbrega, who hired him to work as a comedian, both on TV and on the radio.

His first character was named "Pacífico", a tongue-in-the-cheek young man, that made famous the catch phrase "Ô Cride!", Portuguese for "Hey, Cride!", being "Cride" a Brazilian nickname, or misspell for the name Euclides. A big hit, it paved the way for a cinema career, where he worked on ten movies. Back to television, he brought with himself "Bronco", his main cinema character, and became a big TV hit from 1967 to 1971 with A Família Trapo ("The Trapo Family", a reference to the von Trapp family from The Sound of Music). In this show, Bronco was the brother-in-law of an Italian short-tempered man. Bronco never held a job and lived off his brother-in-law, and he was never too intimidated to view his (often provocative) opinions. His sister was a character played by Renata Fronzi. Golias' character was the most important for the show's "rhythm" and also the funniest character.

In 1979, a short-lived Brazilian version of Mork & Mindy appeared as Superbronco. It was produced by Rede Globo and starred Ronald Golias and actress Liza Vieira. Superbronco had only one season and was canceled although it was among the ten highest TV audience rates in 1979.

Since the early 1990s, he worked in the TV show A Praça é Nossa, playing the character Pacífico, and sometimes also "The Master" (a sage who answered questions from the people using sexual innuendo jokes on them), "Isolda" (a woman who liked to talk about her personal life to Carlos Alberto de Nóbrega, the host of the show A Praça é Nossa) and "Professor Bartolomeu Guimarães". Also was starring since 2004 a TV show of his own called Meu Cunhado, along with another famed Brazilian comedian, Moacyr Franco. When Golias died, there were 22 episodes of Meu Cunhado never shown on TV, and that probably will never be aired, because his family asked SBT to stop airing his material. He was a good friend of the Brazilian comedian Renato Aragão.

Golias died in 2005 in São Paulo, from multiple organ failure, after being hospitalized with lung infection.

Discography

78 rpm disc 
 Lágrimas de Amor / Chico Mulato (1956)
 Trudia / Ai que Humilhação (1957)
 Festa de Aniversário / O Gozadinho Chegou (1957)
 Copa do Mundo / Toureiro (Torero) (1958)
 A Bandolinha / Aguenta Bastiana (1958)
 Ó Crides / Mi Dimira Muito (1959)

LP record 
 Bilhetinhos de Jânio (Coletânea de J. Pereira) (1960)
 "Côrte Rayol Show" (1967) – Guest appearance
 Olímpiaaaa (1967)
 Ronald Golias (1968)
 A escolinha do Golias (1968)
 Ronald Golias (1970)
 Ronald Golias (1972)
 Ronald Golias (1974)
 Humor a quatro (1979)
 As anedotas do Pasquim (1980)

Theatrical performances

Filmography

Television

Film

References

External links 
 

1929 births
2005 deaths
People from São Carlos
Brazilian people of Greek descent
Brazilian male television actors
Brazilian male comedians
Brazilian male film actors
20th-century comedians